Django Warmerdam (born 2 September 1995) is a Dutch professional footballer who plays as a left back for FC Utrecht in the Eredivisie.

Club career
Warmerdam is a youth exponent from AFC Ajax. He made his professional debut at 24 November 2014 against NEC Nijmegen replacing Robert van Koesveld after 81 minutes in a 1–1 draw. In 2017 he transferred to FC Groningen after a season long loan spell with PEC Zwolle.

After having spent three seasons with FC Groningen, Warmerdam moved to FC Utrecht on 3 February 2020 on a three-year contract, joining the club after the season.

Career statistics

References

External links
 
 Netherlands profile at Ons Oranje

1995 births
Living people
People from Teylingen
Association football defenders
Association football midfielders
Dutch footballers
Netherlands under-21 international footballers
AFC Ajax players
Jong Ajax players
PEC Zwolle players
FC Groningen players
FC Utrecht players
Eredivisie players
Eerste Divisie players
Footballers from South Holland